Cedric Pioline was the defending champion, but lost in the first round to Arvind Parmar. Sébastien Grosjean defeated Byron Black 7–6(9–7), 6–3 in the final to secure the title.

Seeds

  Cédric Pioline (first round)
  Tim Henman (first round)
  Fabrice Santoro (second round)
  Sébastien Grosjean (champion)
  Marc Rosset (second round)
  Stefan Koubek (first round)
  Roger Federer (first round)
  Andrew Ilie (first round)

Draw

Finals

Section 1

Section 2

References

External links
 2000 Nottingham Open Singles draw

Singles